Joseph Lual-Acuil Jr. (born 26 April 1994) is a South Sudanese Australian professional basketball player for the Nanjing Tongxi Monkey Kings of the Chinese Basketball Association (CBA). He played college basketball for Neosho County Community College and Baylor University.

Early life
Lual-Acuil was born in Wau, South Sudan. Due to the civil war, he was relocated to a refugee camp in Uganda at the age of three where he lived for three years until his family moved to Australia. Lual-Acuil attended Kingsway Christian College in Perth, Western Australia. He was a soccer player growing up, but picked up the game of basketball after his soccer coach suggested he play for the team one year.

College career

Neosho County CC (2013–2015)
Lual-Acuil played two seasons for Neosho County Community College. In his sophomore year at Neosho County, he averaged 20.1 points, 11.2 rebounds and 4.7 blocks while playing all 30 games. He was named 2015 Jayhawk Conference Defensive Player of the Year and earned a spot in the All-Conference First Team and All-Region First Team.

Baylor (2016–2018)
Lual-Acuil joined Baylor University in the summer of 2015, but sat out his first season for a heart condition. In his year off, Lual-Acuil focused on improving his fitness and strength.

In his junior year, Lual-Acuil was named Big 12 Newcomer of the Week for games played from 12 December through 18 December. In 35 games played during the 2016–17 season, Lual-Acuil averaged 9.1 points, 6.7 rebounds and 2.5 blocks per game and helped the Bears to a 3 seed in the NCAA Tournament. On 5 March 2017, Lual-Acuil earned a spot in the 2017 Big 12 All-Defensive Team and All-Newcomer Team.

On 17 December 2017, Lual-Acuil recorded a double-double and college career-highs of 31 points and 20 rebounds, shooting 10-of-15 from the field, along with three blocks and two assists in a 118–86 blowout win over Savannah State. Lual-Acuil finished his senior year averaging 14 points, 8.6 rebounds and 1.9 blocks per game. On 8 March 2018, Lual-Acuil earned a spot in the 2018 All-Big 12 Third Team. He graduated with a degree in Health Studies and Kinesiology.

Professional career
On 13 August 2018, Lual-Acuil started his professional career with Hapoel Jerusalem of the Israeli Premier League, signing a three-year deal. On 6 February 2019, Lual-Acuil agreed terms to join the Hungarian team Atomerőmű SE, but eventually the deal fell through.

On 10 February 2019, Lual-Acuil was loaned to Hapoel Galil Elyon of the Israeli National League for the rest of the season. On 5 March 2019, Lual-Acuil recorded a season-high 27 points in his fourth game with Galil Elyon, shooting 11-of-17 from the field, along with eleven rebounds and three blocks in an 86–65 win over Hapoel Kfar Saba. In 19 games played for Galil Elyon, he led the league in blocks with 2.3 per game, while averaging 16.6 points and 10.5 rebounds per game. Lual-Acuil helped Galil Elyon reach the league finals, where they eventually were defeated by Maccabi Haifa.

On 20 August 2019, Lual-Acuil signed with Melbourne United in Australia for the 2019–20 NBL season. During the 2020–21 season, he was named NBL Best Sixth Man and helped lead Melbourne to a title. Lual-Acuil averaged 9.7 points, 4.7 rebounds, and 1.4 blocks per game.

In 2021, Lual-Acuil briefly played for the Geelong Supercats in the NBL1 South.

On 30 June 2021, Lual-Acuil re-signed with United on a one-year deal.

In 2022, Lual-Acuil joined the Phoenix Suns' 2022 NBA Summer League roster.

National team
In 2022, Lual-Acuil was selected to play for the South Sudanese national team in the FIBA World Cup Qualifiers.

Personal life
Lual-Acuil's father, Joseph, was South Sudan's first Minister of Humanitarian Affairs and Disaster Management.

References

External links
 Baylor Bears bio
 RealGM profile

1994 births
Living people
Australian expatriate basketball people in the United States
Basketball players from Perth, Western Australia
Baylor Bears men's basketball players
Centers (basketball)
Hapoel Galil Elyon players
Hapoel Jerusalem B.C. players
Junior college men's basketball players in the United States
Melbourne United players
South Sudanese emigrants to Australia
South Sudanese expatriate basketball people in the United States
South Sudanese men's basketball players
South Sudanese refugees
South Sudanese expatriate basketball people in Israel
Refugees in Uganda
Sportsmen from Western Australia
Australian expatriate basketball people in China
Geelong Supercats players
Nanjing Tongxi Monkey Kings players
South Sudanese expatriate basketball people in China